The 2023 Summit League baseball tournament will take place from May 24 through 27, 2023. The top four out of seven teams in the conference's regular season will meet in the double-elimination tournament held at Newman Outdoor Field on the campus of North Dakota State University in Fargo, North Dakota. The winner of the tournament will earn the Summit League's automatic bid to the 2023 NCAA Division I baseball tournament.

Standings and seeding
The top four teams from the regular season will be seeded one through four based on conference winning percentage during the modified double round-robin regular season. The teams then play a double-elimination tournament.

Reference:
 St. Thomas is not eligible for NCAA tournament until 2026

Results

Reference:

References

Summit League Baseball Tournament
 
2023 in sports in North Dakota